The 1936 U.S. Open was the 40th U.S. Open, held June 4–6 at Baltusrol Golf Club in Springfield, New Jersey, west of New York City.

Tony Manero, a relatively unknown pro from New York playing out of North Carolina, surpassed third round leader Harry Cooper in the final round to claim his only major title. The purse was $5,000 and the winner's share was $1,000. The Upper Course was used for this championship; the Lower Course has been used for all subsequent majors at Baltusrol.

Entering the final round, Cooper led Manero by four strokes. Manero's final round 67 (−5) was a course record and gave him a 72-hole total of 282 (−6), two strokes ahead of Cooper, who shot 73 (+1) for 284. Manero's total of 282 set a new U.S. Open tournament record by four shots; the previous record of 286 was set in 1916.

Manero was fortunate to even be in the championship, because during sectional qualifying, he needed a chip-in on his final hole just to qualify. His victory was not without controversy. During the final round he was paired with Gene Sarazen, whose tournament scoring record he would break. Sarazen apparently requested the pairing as he believed he could help the notoriously high-strung Manero, a close friend, stay calm. Afterwards a complaint was filed with the USGA alleging that Sarazen was actually giving advice to Manero, a violation of the rules. After a meeting, the USGA ruled that there was no evidence of any wrongdoing, and Manero was allowed to keep the championship.

In contrast to the previous year, scoring conditions at the Open were ideal throughout the week. For the tournament, 38 players broke par and the scoring average was 76.04, both numbers setting U.S. Open records. Chuck Kocsis finished as low amateur in a tie for 14th place.

A record field of 1,278 entered the qualifying for this U.S. Open, up from 1,177 in 1935.

Course

Upper Course

Source:
Note: The Lower Course has been used for all subsequent majors at Baltusrol.

Lengths of the courses for previous major championships at Baltusrol:
, par 74 - 1915 U.S. Open (Old Course)   The Old Course was plowed under in 1918
, par      - 1903 U.S. Open (Old Course)

Past champions in the field

Made the cut 

Source:

Missed the cut 

Source:

Round summaries

First round
Thursday, June 4, 1936

Source:

Second round
Friday, June 5, 1936

Source:

Third round
Saturday, June 6, 1936 (morning)

Source:

Final round
Saturday, June 6, 1936 (afternoon)

Source:

References

External links
USGA Championship Database
USOpen.com - 1936

U.S. Open (golf)
Golf in New Jersey
Springfield Township, Union County, New Jersey
U.S. Open
U.S. Open
U.S. Open
U.S. Open